Sinjaeviella is a genus of moths in the family Cossidae.

Species
Sinjaeviella elegantissima Yakovlev, 2009
Sinjaeviella renatae Yakovlev, 2011

References

Natural History Museum Lepidoptera generic names catalog

Zeuzerinae